Jacques Talbot (12 November 1678 (bap) – January 2, 1756) minor cleric, schoolmaster; b. at La Plaine (dept. of Maine-et-Loire), France, and baptized 12 Nov. 1678, son of Jacques Talbot and Mathurine Sylvain; d. 2 Jan. 1756 in Montreal.

Early life
Jacques Talbot-dit-Gervais, who arrived in New France in 1716, went to become a schoolmaster at Montreal, probably replacing Antoine Forget. The first school, which had been set up for the sons of the settlers by Gabriel Souart* in 1666, was held in the Sulpician seminary in Montreal until 1683, when it was decided to construct a building on a piece of land donated by the parish council of Notre-Dame. In 1686 the "petites écoles" – this was the name given the primary school under the French régime – where teaching was always given free of charge, became independent of the seminary and two men’s orders made their appearance: the "Teaching Brothers," also called Rouillé Brothers [see Louis-François de La Faye*], who remained under the direction of Saint-Sulpice, and later the Brothers Hospitallers of the Cross and of St Joseph, founded in 1692 by François Charon* de La Barre, who wanted to superintend the Montreal schools. Saint-Sulpice was opposed to the project put forward by the latter and took charge of teaching again, ensuring that they obtained competent teachers from their seminary in Paris; it was thus that Yves Priat, Armand Donay, Jacques-Anne Bœsson, Antoine Forget, Marc-Anselme de Métivier, Jean Girard, and particularly Jacques Talbot came to New France Jacques Talbot probably prepared to become a schoolmaster by learning the methods of the founder of the Brothers of the Christian Schools, Jean-Baptiste de La Salle, methods in great vogue at that time among the Sulpicians. For his teaching he made use of school books brought from France: Latin primers, psalters, offices of the Holy Virgin, La Salle’s Devoirs d’un Chrétien envers Dieu (1703). In 1742, in correspondence with their confrères in Paris, the Sulpicians of Montreal requested for Talbot "12 copies of L’Escole paroissiale or the manner of teaching children in primary school," a work published in Paris in 1654. This manual of pedagogy remains as evidence of the methods of teaching in use in the 17th century. In sending for 12, Talbot probably intended to distribute them among his colleagues, for, the population of Montreal having grown, the number of schoolmasters likewise had to be increased. By 1693 mention was already being made of a "head master," who was in charge of the "petites écoles," which leads us to think that there was a junior master. Jean Girard, who arrived in Montreal in 1724, taught along with Talbot for several years. The situation was, however, different in the rest of New France. If the inhabitants of Montreal were able to profit from schoolmasters trained according to La Salle’s methods, the same was not true for the other parishes in the colony. Some of them could only count on the nuns of the Congregation of Notre-Dame or the Ursulines, and on a few missionaries or parish priests who were ready to dispense the rudiments of reading and writing. As for the others, most of the time they had to be content with teachers who had no diploma other than their goodwill, a little education, and a great deal of devotion to the cause of teaching. It was quite sufficient at the time to dispense the teaching laid down by the programme of the "petites écoles": the catechism, reading, writing, and arithmetic, to which were added a few elements of domestic science for the girls. Among these schoolmasters may be mentioned Charles Corvaisier, who is known to have been at Sainte-Anne-de-la-Pérade in 1738–39; Nicolas Datte, at Batiscan in 1721; and Étienne Guillemin, at Beauport in 1750. As for Jacques Talbot, he taught at Montreal for nearly 40 years and died there on 2 Jan. 1756 at 77 years of age.

External links

 

Talbot, Jacques
Talbot, Jacques
Talbot, Jacques
Talbot, Jacques